"Panic Prone" is the third and final single from Chevelle's third album This Type of Thinking (Could Do Us In), and the album's sixth track.

Background 
Drummer Sam Loeffler said in an interview, "Panic Prone is an interesting song because I've just recently learned what it's about. Pete was watching television and one of those commercials came on, 'Save the Children' commercials. That song is about making a decision whether you're going to sit on your couch and watch this happen or you're going to stand up and do something about it. That song isn't about if you should or shouldn't do it, it's just about – Are you going to do it? Is this my problem? I was really surprised that it was about that. I think one of the lines is actually about one of our friend's falling off the wagon, too. I think the first line might be about that."

The single did not achieve commercial success and peaked at number 26 on the Billboard Hot Mainstream Rock Tracks, that being the only category in which it charted.

Track listing

Charts

Notes 

Chevelle (band) songs
2004 songs
Songs written by Pete Loeffler
Songs written by Sam Loeffler
Song recordings produced by Michael Baskette